Benjamin Toppan Pickman (1790 – March 12, 1835), was a Massachusetts politician who served as President of the Massachusetts Senate, a member of the Massachusetts House of Representatives and as a member and President of the Boston Common Council.

Pickman was the son of Massachusetts Congressman Benjamin Pickman, Jr.

See also
 54th Massachusetts General Court (1833)
 55th Massachusetts General Court (1834)
 56th Massachusetts General Court (1835)

References 
 Roberts, Oliver Ayer: of the Military company of the Massachusetts, now called The Ancient and Honorable Company of Massachusetts. Volume II. 1738-1828., Boston, MA: The Ancient and Honorable Company of Massachusetts., p. 408, (1897).
 City of Boston: A Catalogue of the City Councils of Boston, 1822–1908, Roxbury, 1846–1867, Charlestown 1847-1873 and of The Selectmen of Boston, 1634-1822 also of Various Other Town and Municipal officers, Boston, MA: City of Boston Printing Department, (1909).

Notes

 

1790 births
1835 deaths
Members of the Massachusetts House of Representatives
Boston City Council members
Massachusetts state senators
Presidents of the Massachusetts Senate
Politicians from Salem, Massachusetts
19th-century American politicians